Discovery  is an album by Larry Carlton, released in 1987. It also features Kirk Whalum and his tenor saxophone solos on several tracks, with Terry Trotter on keyboards, John Peña on bass and Rick Marotta on drums.

Track listing
"Hello Tomorrow" 	5:22
"Those Eyes" 	4:17
"Knock on Wood" 	6:21
"Discovery" 	5:22
"My Home Away from Home" 4:53
"March of the Jazz Angels" 	5:14
"Minute by Minute" 	4:58
"A Place for Skipper" 	4:45
"Her Favorite Song" 1:55

References

1987 albums
Larry Carlton albums
Jazz fusion albums by American artists
MCA Records albums